Ikehara (written: 池原) is a Japanese surname mainly found in Okinawa. Notable people with the surname include:

Ayaka Ikehara (born 1990), Japanese handball player
, Japanese mathematician

Japanese-language surnames